A cingulid is a term used when describing teeth, it refers to a ridge that runs around the base of the crown of a lower tooth (the equivalent on the upper teeth is the cingulum). The presence or absence of a cingulid is often a diagnostic feature for different species of animal, especially among mammals. 

Some animals don't have a cingulid. Those that do may have them on only some, or all of the teeth, though most often on the molar teeth. It can be on the upper or lower teeth, or both. There are four common descriptions of the position of the cingulid:

Lingual cingulid - a cingulid on the side of the tooth that is next to the tongue
Labial cingulid - a cingulid on the side of the tooth that is next to the lips or cheeks
Distal cingulid - a cingulid on the side of the tooth facing the tooth behind it in the jaw (can also be referred to as a posterior cingulid)
Mesial cingulid - a cingulid on the side of the tooth facing the tooth in front of it in the jaw (can also be referred to as an anterior cingulid)

References 

Parts of tooth